Živojinović is a Serbian patronymic surname derived from a masculine given name Živojin. Notable people with the surname include:

 Velimir Živojinović Masuka (1886–1974), Serbian theater director
 Branimir Živojinović (1930–2007), Serbian poet, son of Velimir
 Velimir Bata Živojinović (1933–2016), Serbian actor
 Aleksandar Živojinović (born 1953), better known as Alex Lifeson, Canadian musician
 Fahreta Živojinović (born 1960 as Fahreta Jahić), better known as Lepa Brena, Bosnian folk singer and wife of Slobodan Živojinović
 Slobodan Živojinović (born 1963), Serbian tennis player

Serbian surnames
Patronymic surnames
Surnames from given names